The 1975 Virginia Slims of Boston, also known that year as the US Indoor Championships,  was a women's tennis tournament played on indoor carpet courts at the Boston University Walter Brown Arena  in Boston, Massachusetts in the United States that was part of the 1975 Virginia Slims World Championship Series. The tournament was held from March 3 through March 8, 1975. Martina Navratilova won the singles title and earned $15,000 first-prize money.

Finals

Singles
 Martina Navratilova defeated  Evonne Goolagong 6–2, 4–6, 6–3

Doubles
 Rosie Casals /  Billie Jean King defeated  Chris Evert /  Martina Navratilova 6–3, 6–4

Prize money

Notes

References

External links
 Women's Tennis Association (WTA) tournament details

Virginia Slims of Boston
Virginia Slims of Boston
Virginia
Virginia